Hndrxx (pronounced "Hendrix") is the sixth studio album by American rapper Future. It was released on February 24, 2017, through A1 Recordings, Freebandz, and Epic Records. It followed the release of Future's eponymously-titled fifth album by one week, and features guest appearances from Rihanna, The Weeknd, Chris Brown, and Nicki Minaj.

Hndrxx was supported by four singles: "Selfish", "Pie", "Incredible", and "You da Baddest". The album received positive critical reviews and charted at number one, making Future the first artist to release two Billboard 200 chart topping albums in consecutive weeks. It was included on lists of 2017's best albums by various publications, including Complex, Pitchfork, Fact, and Entertainment Weekly.

Background
Online music magazine Hits Daily Double announced on February 22, 2017, that Future was set to release another album a week after the eponymously titled album Future (2017), set to include more "rhythmic-leaning and radio-friendly" tracks. The release was first announced by Future during a Q&A on social media on February 21, 2017, along with him tweeting the pre-order link for Hndrxx. The album is also eponymously named after Future's alter ego, Future Hendrix.

Promotion
"Selfish", featuring Barbadian singer Rihanna, was released as the album's lead single on February 28, 2017, the song was produced by Detail, Kuk Harrell, Major Seven, and Mantra. It peaked at number 37 on the US Billboard Hot 100.

"Pie", featuring American singer Chris Brown, was released as the second single on June 25, 2017, the song was produced by D. A. Doman and Detail. It peaked at number 48 on the US Hot R&B/Hip-Hop Songs.

The album's third single, "Incredible", was released to rhythmic contemporary radio on July 25, 2017, the song was produced by Dre Moon. It peaked at number 48 on the Hot R&B/Hip-Hop Songs.

"You da Baddest", featuring Trinidadian-American rapper Nicki Minaj, was released as the album's fourth single on July 28, 2017, the song was produced by Detail and Go Grizz. It peaked at number 38 on the Billboard Hot 100.

Critical reception

Hndrxx was met with generally positive reviews. At Metacritic, which assigns a normalized rating out of 100 to reviews from professional publications, the album received an average score of 78, based on eight reviews. Aggregator AnyDecentMusic? gave it 7.1 out of 10, based on their assessment of the critical consensus.

Neil Z. Yeung of AllMusic said, "Released just a week after his self-titled fifth effort, Future's HNDRXX provided an introspective and confessional complement to the more extroverted Future". Ural Garrett of HipHopDX said, "HNDRXX provides a view into a modern rock star indulging in a side of himself that's more thoughtful and dare one say, honest". Rebecca Haithcoat of Pitchfork said, "Over a well-played hand of wistful, bright-eyed and reflective beats, HNDRXX strikes a near-perfect balance between a man still licking his wounds and a man emerging from a long, dark night". Preezy of XXL said, "HNDRXX is a reminder that no matter how hard he tries to shun his reputation as a hitmaker, Future remains one of the most reliable acts in mainstream music, his reluctance aside".

Michael Madden of Consequence said, "While his most definitive project remains 2015's Dirty Sprite 2 for its balance of Future's innate melodic sense and especially effective trap records, HNDRXX comes in as a close second". Kristian Brito of The Quietus said, "It's the slickest, spaciest project he's released since Honest (which was always underrated), and sits far left of the trap rigor mortis of the self-titled record". Mosi Reeves of Rolling Stone said, "Like its predecessor, it's an hour-plus data dump of quotidian creativity with a slight thematic focus, not a tightly sequenced tour de force. But Future wouldn't be Future if he wasn't unburdening himself, no matter how messy and polarizing the results might be. And for the most part, he's at his most appealing here".

Year-end lists

Commercial performance
Hndrxx debuted at number one on the US Billboard 200 with 121,000 album-equivalent units, of which 48,000 were pure album sales. It replaced Future's own self-titled album from the previous week at number one, making him the first artist in the history of the Billboard 200 to have two albums debut at number one in successive weeks. As of July 5, 2017, the album has moved 435,000 album-equivalent units.

Track listing

Notes
  signifies a co-producer
  signifies a vocal producer

Sample credits
  "Damage" contains a portion of "Piece of My Love", written by William Gaitling, Gene Griffin, Aaron Hall, and Teddy Riley, as performed by Guy.
  "Neva Missa Lost" contains an interpolation of "My Heart Belongs to U", written by Donald DeGrate and Cedric Hailey, as performed by Jodeci.

Personnel
Credits were adapted from the album's liner notes and Tidal.

Musicians
 Jim Stewart – keyboards (track 18)
 Thomas Klotz – keyboards (track 18)
 Justefan – vibraphone (track 18)

Technical
 Ryan Coplan – assistant engineer (tracks 1, 6, 14, 17)
 Mike Synphony – assistant engineer (tracks 3, 7, 10–13)
 Chris Galland – assistant engineer (tracks 5, 8)
 Jeff Jackson – assistant engineer (tracks 5, 8)
 Robin Florent – assistant engineer (tracks 5, 8)
 Bill Zimmerman – engineer (track 15)
 David Nakaji – assistant engineer (tracks 18–19)
 Ivan Jimenez – assistant engineer (tracks 18–19)
 Nick Valentin – assistant engineer (track 19)

Charts

Weekly charts

Year-end charts

Certifications

Release history

References

2017 albums
Future (rapper) albums
Albums produced by Detail (record producer)
Albums produced by DJ Mustard
Albums produced by Jake One
Albums produced by Metro Boomin
Albums produced by Southside (record producer)
Albums produced by Cubeatz
Albums produced by Cirkut
Albums produced by Kuk Harrell
Epic Records albums
Avant-pop albums
Contemporary R&B albums by American artists